Chincholi is a village in Junnar Taluka of Pune District, Maharashtra, India.

References

Villages in Pune district